The 1770s (pronounced "seventeen-seventies") was a decade of the Gregorian calendar that began on January 1, 1770, and ended on December 31, 1779. A period full of discoveries,  breakthroughs happened in all walks of life, as what emerged at this period brought life to most innovations we know today.

From nations such as the United States, birthed through hardships such as the American Revolutionary War and altercations akin to the Boston Tea Party, spheres of influence such as the Russian Empire's sphere from its victorious Crimean claims at the Russo-Turkish War, the Industrial Revolution, and populism, their influence remains omnipresent to this day. 

New lands south of the Equator were discovered and settled by Europeans like James Cook, expanding the horizons of a New World to new reaches such as Australia and French Polynesia. Deepened philosophical studies led to the publication of works such as Adam Smith's "The Wealth of Nations", whose concepts influence much of modern socio-economic thought, and sowed the seeds to the global incumbent  neoliberal world order. Studies on chemistry and politics deepen to forge the Age of Reason for centuries to come.

References